The Jin River, also known by its Chinese name , is located in southern Fujian. Its basin includes most of Quanzhou prefecture-level city, whose Jinjiang County is named after it.

Name
The name of the river comes from 3rd-to-5th-century Jin Empire, during which time its banks were settled by Chinese colonists from the Central Plains.

Geography
The upper course of the Jin is also known as the Xixi ("West Creek"). It originates in the Daiyun Mountains and flows generally southeast for  into Quanzhou Bay on the Taiwan Strait. East of Nan'an, the Xixi receives its major tributary, the Dongxi ("East Creek"), from the north. The Jin River develops an estuary as it enters Quanzhou Bay from the west. There, it separates downtown Quanzhou to the north from Jinjiang to its south.

There are 13 towns around the river: Chinyan, Chidian, Chendai, Luoshan, Cizao, Neikeng, Anhai, Dongshi, Yonghe, Yinglin, Longhu, Shenhu and Jinjinchu. Zimao Mountain is also nearby.

Climate

See also
 List of rivers of China
 

Rivers of Fujian
Quanzhou
Jinjiang, Fujian
Taiwan Strait